Ilderton may refer to:

Places
Canada
 Ilderton, Ontario

England
 Ilderton, Northumberland